Ernocornutia lamna is a species of moth of the family Tortricidae. It is found in Peru.

The wingspan is 17 mm. The ground colour of the forewings is yellow brown with a pale orange hue, darker suffusions and browner spots. The markings are yellow brown with browner dots. The hindwings are cream, tinged with yellow posteriorly.

Etymology
The species name refers to the shape of the terminal plate of the gnathos and is derived from Latin lamna (meaning a flat piece of metal).

References

Moths described in 2010
Euliini
Moths of South America
Taxa named by Józef Razowski